Babalkan-e Sofla (also Romanized as Bābalkān-e Soflá; also known as Bābalkān-e Pā’īn and Pā’īn Bābolkān) is a village in Lalehabad Rural District, Lalehabad District, Babol County, Mazandaran Province, Iran. At the 2006 census, its population was 161, in 41 families.

References 

Populated places in Babol County